Thomas Edward Fern (1 April 1886 – 21 March 1966) was an English footballer who played as a goalkeeper for Worksop Town, Lincoln City, Everton, and Port Vale. He won the Football League with Everton in 1914–15.

Career
Fern started his career with Mafeking Rovers, Worksop Albion, and Worksop Town. He signed with Lincoln City in 1909, who had just been re-elected into the Football League. The "Imps" finished 15th in the Second Division in 1909–10, but failed re-election after a last place finish in 1910–11. After spending the 1911–12 season in the Central League, they regained admittance to the Football League and finished in eighth place in 1912–13. He made a total of 169 league and cup appearances at Sincil Bank.

Fern moved on to Everton, who finished 15th in the First Division in 1913–14, before winning the league title in 1914–15. League football was then suspended due to World War I. After hostilities ended, the "Toffees" finished 16th in 1919–20, seventh in 1920–21, 20th in 1921–22, fifth in 1922–23, and seventh in 1923–24. Fern made 231 league appearances during his time at Goodison Park.

He joined Port Vale in June 1924. He was preferred to the inexperienced Sidney Brown and Robert Wallis, and played 37 Second Division and three FA Cup games in the 1924–25 season. He made 39 appearances in the 1925–26 season. However, in September 1926, at age 40, he picked up an injury and lost his first team place at The Old Recreation Ground. He played just 11 games in the 1926–27 season, as goalkeeping duties were shared out between Fern, George Holdcroft, Howard Matthews, and Alex Binnie. Fern then left the club and continued his playing career with Colwyn Bay United.

Career statistics
Source:

Honours
Everton
Football League First Division: 1914–15

References

1886 births
1966 deaths
People from Measham
Footballers from Leicestershire
English footballers
Association football goalkeepers
Worksop Town F.C. players
Lincoln City F.C. players
Everton F.C. players
Port Vale F.C. players
English Football League players